Eros Airport or Windhoek Eros Airport  is an airport serving Windhoek, the capital and largest city of Namibia.

Operations
Eros is a busy hub of general aviation and some commercial aviation, which includes Wilderness Air, Bay Air, Westair Aviation, Scenic Air. The airport is one of the busiest airports in the SADC region. It is the host to commercial, private, and scheduled traffic ranging from high performance jet aircraft to Cessna 152 trainers. The majority of traffic comes from the general aviation charter market, consisting mainly of the Cessna 210 aircraft, which is the most commonly used aircraft for charter and fly-in safaris in Namibia. Scenic-Air operates a regular charter service from Eros Airport, using Cessna Centurion equipment. The airport handles approximately 150 to 200 movements per day (around 50,000 per year). In 2016, the airport served 74,356 passengers. Wilderness Air offers regular transfers to Maun in Botswana, Livingstone and Lusaka in Zambia, and Victoria Falls in Zimbabwe. In April 2018, Westair Aviation files scheduled passenger services to 6 new destinations in Namibia and South Africa. In late July 2019 Air Namibia, which ceased operations in February 2021, moved its Lüderitz and Oranjemund operations from Hosea Kutako International Airport to Eros. It is also home to the Gambian Government Air Transport Unit

Facilities
Other facilities on offer include car rentals, retail, food and beverages, advertising and aircraft hangars. The aerodrome reference code is 3C. The aerodrome Rescue and Fire Fighting has a Category 4 certification.

Airlines and destinations

Passenger

The following airlines operate regular scheduled services at the airport:

Additionally, there are several minor charter operators based there.

Cargo

Statistics

Accidents and incidents
 In January 2008, a Cessna 210 crashed after takeoff killing the pilot and all 6 tourists on board. The accident was ruled to be caused by pilot error, according to the Directorate of Aircraft Accident Investigations.

See also
List of airports in Namibia
Transport in Namibia

References

External links
 
 

Airports in Namibia
Khomas Region
Buildings and structures in Windhoek